WNYT is the college radio station for the New York Institute of Technology.  It is available via Internet radio, and heard at various places on NYIT's campus.

History 
Located on the Old Westbury campus of New York Institute of Technology, WNYT Radio was formed in 1964 as a student organization, where it began and still is a completely student-run station.  WNYT also operated as a separate closed-circuit station at the college's New York City campus when it was located at 888 7th avenue in Manhattan in the early to mid-1970s.  It was entirely student operated and featured a rock format.

With the lack of available frequency allocations in the area, WNYT has gone through an array of changes through the years in its broadcasting mediums — carrier current, closed circuit, the background music for Cablevision’s on-screen program guide, and most recently, Internet streaming audio.  In addition changes have occurred in the programming formats WNYT has relied upon, from all rock music to its current open format.

WNYT Radio has served as a springboard for a wide array of talent and air personalities, with its members going on to become prominent members the New York media market.  In addition, it has acted as a voice of the NYIT campus since it was established in the 1960s.  It is one of the few college radio stations on Long Island, or the greater metropolitan area, that is entirely run by its students.  From its air personalities, to the programming, all aspects of the station are overseen by the students of NYIT.

WNYT Radio programming has been successful; many shows, including the political talk show Elephant Bangs Donkey, Entenmann's and M 80s, Sound System, The Verk and Santro Show, The Dream team and The Extreme Metal Show, have brought a large amount of interest and praise from record labels and bands in the Long Island area.

Starting in 2012, WNYT Radio began broadcasting NYIT Bears sports on their station, a move that brings a larger audience.

Noteworthy WNYT alumni 
 Alan Statsky '72, producer and news writer, NBC-TV, WCBS-TV, WOR-TV
 Bryan Jackson '73, Press Officer to Governor Mario Cuomo, Owner WCDA-FM (Albany, New York)
 Carol Silva '76, anchor News12 Long Island
 Jim Douglas '82, morning personality, WKJY
 Donna Vaughan '86,'87, news director, WALK-FM
 Tracy Burgess '88, news editor, “Imus in the Morning”
 Dennis Falcone '79, nationally syndicated program producer, Premiere Radio Networks, regular on the Opie and Anthony Show, and regularly appears on Opie with Jim Norton
 Maria Milito '83, mid-day air personality, WAXQ
 Don Faithfull '80, engineer, WABC-TV
 Scotty Hart '92, air personality, WLNG
 Frank DiMaulo '87, audio engineer and editor, As the World Turns
 Steve Singer '79, audio engineer; NBC;
 John Caracciolo, vice president and general manager of The Morey Organization’s radio group, founder of JVC Broadcasting
 Tom Mortensen, morning show producer, WDRE
 Mark Alan Biggs International broadcaster
 Bruce Perens, while at Pixar was credited on Toy Story 2, A Bug's Life
 Mark Rosenman Host, Producer WLIE 540am SPORTSTALKNY, Sports Author
• Matt Craig '80 Formerly of WGLI-AM and WNYG-AM Babylon, NY and WEBE 108 Bridgeport, CT. He also produces and hosts an internet radio show New York's Best Rock, now on 9 different internet stations. In addition, Matt also hosts the webs largest hobby site documenting his collection of radio audio, www.bigappleairchecks.com. 

- John Albertson’87 PhotoJournalist: News 12 Long Island, NY 1987-88, WNHT Concord, NH 1988-89, DP freelance New York,NY 1989-2004, WNBC New York 2004 -

External links 
 Official webcast
 New York Institute of Technology

Internet radio stations in the United States
Radio stations established in 1964
NYT
New York Institute of Technology
Mass media in Nassau County, New York
1964 establishments in New York (state)